"Frost and Fire" is a short story by Ray Bradbury and the fourteenth in his collection R is for Rocket. It was first published in Planet Stories (Fall, 1946) as "The Creatures That Time Forgot". The story is about short-lived humans on a planet similar to Mercury.

Plot summary
Placed there by a past rocket ship that crashed, the people of the storied land are within sight of another rocket ship on a distant mountain plateau. The plot follows Sim, the protagonist of this story, and his apparently short life on a planet where people are cursed by radiation to live only eight days. 

The people of this planet are also gifted with racial memory (they remember their ancestors' memories). However, they do not attempt to reach the sole remaining rocket ship due to the futility of attempting to reach it in one hour, which is the longest length of time between day and night (both deadly). 

Sim is then moved by the memory of his ancestors to find and meet with scientists who make halting progress towards the goal of lengthening the world's decreased life span. Sim, motivated by his dwindling days, makes it his goal to extend his life and reach the distant rocket, despite the protests of his sister and other cave-dwellers.

Graphic novel adaptation
"Frost and Fire" was adapted as a graphic novel. It is the third in the DC Science Fiction Graphic Novel series, by Klaus Janson in 1985.

Movie adaptation
An independent short film Quest, based on "Frost and Fire" and directed by Elaine and Saul Bass, was released in 1983.

References

External links
 
 

1946 short stories
Science fiction short stories
Short stories by Ray Bradbury
Works originally published in Planet Stories
Short stories adapted into films